A rock shelter (also rockhouse, crepuscular cave, bluff shelter, or abri) is a shallow cave-like opening at the base of a bluff or cliff. In contrast to solutional caves (karst), which are often many miles long, rock shelters are almost always modest in size and extent.

Formation
Rock shelters form because a rock stratum such as sandstone that is resistant to erosion and weathering has formed a cliff or bluff, but a softer stratum, more subject to erosion and weathering, lies just below the resistant stratum, and thus undercuts the cliff.

In arid areas, wind erosion (Aeolian erosion) can be an important factor in rockhouse formation. In most humid areas, the most important factor in rockhouse formation is frost spalling, where the softer, more porous rock underneath is pushed off, tiny pieces at a time, by frost expansion from water frozen in the pores. Erosion from moving water is seldom a significant factor.

Many rock shelters are found under waterfalls.

Human habitat

Rock shelters are often important archaeologically. Because rock shelters form natural shelters from the weather, prehistoric humans often used them as living-places, and left behind debris, tools, and other artifacts. In mountainous areas the shelters can also be important for mountaineers.

Transhumant nomads, people who move with their livestock - often from lower permanent winter residences in the valleys to higher summer pastures - frequently build semi-permanent camps, often of rocks.

In western Connecticut and eastern New York, many rock shelters are known by the colloquialism "leatherman caves", as they were inhabited by the Leatherman over three decades in the late 19th century.

Unique vegetation
The Cumberland stitchwort (Minuartia cumberlandensis) is an endangered species of plant which is found only in rock shelters in Kentucky and Tennessee.

See also

References

Further reading 
 Acosta et al., 2018. "Climate change and peopling of the Neotropics during the Pleistocene-Holocene transition". Boletín de la Sociedad Geológica Mexicana.

External links